Igor Džambazov (born 15 July 1963) is a Macedonian actor, showman, TV presenter, comedian, singer, songwriter, and prosaist. He was born on July 15, 1963 in Skopje to composer Aleksandar Džambazov and actress Anče Džambazova. His grandfather was the renowned Macedonian actor Petre Prličko.

Film career 
His acting career began at the young age of 12 with the film Makedonskiot del od pekolot ('Macedonian Part of Hell'), however his first major role was in the TV Series based on the book Volšebnoto samarče by Vančo Nikoleski. He was the lead actor in the film, and acted alongside the legendary Macedonian actor Risto Šiškov.

Filmography 
 Наша Мала Клиника, 2010–2011
 Боли ли? Прва Балкан Догма (Does it hurt? First Balkan Dogma) 2007
 Ноќта спроти Свети Василиј, 2002
 Збогум на 20-тиот век, ('Goodbye, 20th Century!') 1998
 Welcome to Sarajevo 1997
 Македонија може, ('Macedonia Can') 1991
 Викенд на мртовци, 1988
 Девојките на Марко, (Marko's Girlfriends) 1987
 Училиште за кловнови, (Clown School) 1987
 Сонце на дланка, 1986
 Климент Охридски, ('Clement of Ohrid') 1986
 Волшебното самарче, 1975
 Македонскиот дел од пеколот, ('Macedonian Part of Hell') 1971

Musical career
Igor Džambazov was born in Skopje in a family of actors and musicians. His grandfather Petre Prličko was a celebrated actor, his father Aleksandar Džambazov is a conductor and composer and his mother Anče Džambazova was an actress. In his autobiography Toa sum jas (That's Me), he states that the first music he had ever heard was his father's schlagers and at first he thought that it was the only music in the world, but later he figured out the con and started listening to something modern.

He formed his first music group Pop at only 12 years in 1975 and was actively engaged playing in the garages and bomb shelters around Skopje. Fifteen years later, he becomes member of Havana. Igor with the other two members of the band, Zeko and Pižerecorded three songs: "Daj mi, žiti se..." (Give Me, Please), "Nema spas" (No Relief) and "Štok mi bejbi" (Stock Me Baby) in only few months of the existence of their band. The songs were recorded in the studio of Toše Pop Simonov. Havana band had one of their most notable appearance on 8 September 1991, the day when Macedonia gained its independence from Yugoslavia. Then the band fell under bankruptcy.

In the years that followed he participated in several national musical festivals, for which Igor acknowledges, is his biggest mistake in the field of music. From the national festival MakFest 1991, the song "Ljubov zapej mi" (Love, Sing to Me), which Igor recorded with sisters Tanya and Lydia Kocovski and John Ilija Apelgrin, became the most performed song between two festivals in Macedonia. In 1992 he recorded two of his hits "Čija si" (Whose Are You) and "Grev ili špricer" (Sin Or Spritzer), and again participated in MakFest 1992 in which he performed the song "Vreme za plačenje" (Time for Crying) and received the second prize from the audience. Also, he won the sixth place on InterFest, a music festival in Bitola in 1994 and in the same year published his first solo album called Greatest Hits. It was recorded in studio ROSS on tape and was produced by Robert Sazdov with the program and arrangement made by Darko Mijalkovski. The complete author of the songs is Igor Džambazov, except for one which was inspired by the song "Dancing in the Street" by Mick Jagger and David Bowie.

Bibliography
 Igor Džambazov – Гол човек ('Naked Man') 
 Igor Džambazov – Тоа сум јас ('That's me')
 Igor Džambazov – Прирачник за анти – антиалкохоличари ('Manual for anti – anti alcoholics')
 Igor Džambazov – Приказни од Мјаукедонија ('Stories from Meowcedonia')
 Igor Džambazov – Облечен човек ('Clothed Man')
 Igor Džambazov – Улица Диши Длабоко ('Street Breath Deeply')

References

Macedonian male film actors
Macedonian stand-up comedians
20th-century Macedonian male singers
Macedonian writers
Macedonian entertainers
1963 births
Living people
Male actors from Skopje
Musicians from Skopje
Macedonian male television actors